Lorien Novalis School for Rudolf Steiner Education is a Steiner school located in , a suburb in The Hills Shire, in northwestern Sydney, New South Wales, Australia. Established in 1971, the school teaches students from early learning, and Years K to 12; and also offers playgroup services.

History
Lorien Novalis is named after Lothlórien from Tolkien's book The Lord of the Rings and Novalis, the German poet who was inspired by works of Goethe.

The school is a member of the Association of Independent Schools NSW and Steiner Education Australia.

Campus

Curriculum
All students throughout the school follow a universal curriculum including English, Mathematics, Science, Social Science (History & Geography), Art, Music, Craft/Technology, Language, Performing Arts, Eurythmy, and PE/Health/PD. In the high school, students also have the opportunity through an elective program of extension work in various subjects.

Students who graduate from the school receive the Lorien Novalis Class 12 Certificate of Steiner Education. They continue to access undergraduate university courses through the STAT examination, audition/portfolio and/or interview. Classes 11 and 12 follow the school's Steiner curriculum, which does cross-map against various Preliminary and HSC subjects. Currently, these courses are credentialed by the Board of Studies NSW, in a Preliminary HSC Record of Achievement for each student. However an ATAR is unachievable even if students complete the required 10 units of subjects.

Extracurricular activities
Once a term Lorien holds an Insight Day, where prospective parents can come along and find out about what the school has to offer.

At Lorien, sports are played for enjoyment and overall well-being rather than competition. They include aquatics, athletics, badminton, basketball, dance, soccer, squash, and volleyball. High school students may choose to participate in abseiling, caving, canyoning, or rock climbing.

References

External links
Lorien Novalis School

Educational institutions established in 1971
Private primary schools in Sydney
Waldorf schools in Australia
1971 establishments in Australia
The Hills Shire
Private secondary schools in Sydney
Things named after Tolkien works